The 1902–03 Williams Ephs men's ice hockey season was the inaugural season of play for the program.

Season
A team from Williams had played Rensselaer the year before but they had done so without being official representatives of the college.

Roster

Standings

Schedule and Results

|-
!colspan=12 style=";" | Regular Season

References

Williams Ephs men's ice hockey seasons
Williams
Williams
Williams
Williams